"Clock Strikes" is a hip hop song by hip-hop duo Timbaland & Magoo, released as the third single from their debut studio album, Welcome to Our World, on April 14, 1998. The track features rapper Mad Skillz. The song peaked at #37 on the Billboard Hot 100 singles chart, making it their second top 40 hit on the chart after their debut single "Up Jumps da Boogie". It also peaked at on the Hot R&B/Hip-Hop Singles & Tracks chart.

Track listing
 CD single
 "Clock Strikes" (Remix - Radio Edit) - 3:43
 "Clock Strikes" (Album Version) - 4:41

 Maxi CD single
 "Clock Strikes" (Remix - Radio Edit) - 3:43
 "Clock Strikes" (Remix - Extended Radio Edit) - 5:18
 "Clock Strikes" (Remix - Extended Instrumental) - 5:18
 "Clock Strikes" (Remix - Extended Acapella) - 5:18

Chart positions

References

1997 songs
1998 singles
Song recordings produced by Timbaland
Timbaland songs
Songs written by Timbaland